Andis may refer to:
 Andis, East Azerbaijan
 Andis, Markazi